Courniou is a commune in the Hérault department in southern France.

Geography

Climate
Courniou has a warm-summer mediterranean climate (Köppen climate classification Csb).

Population

See also
Communes of the Hérault department

References

Communes of Hérault